Our Lady of Victory (OLV) is a Catholic parish in Cincinnati, Ohio. Victory is a part of the Roman Catholic Archdiocese of Cincinnati. It is the third oldest parish in Hamilton County, Ohio, established in 1842 as a log cabin. OLV was originally known as St. Stephens until 1853. The school is one of the largest in the area and is one of only two in Delhi Township, Ohio.

School
OLV serves grades pre-kindergarten through eighth grade. Extra-curricular classes include technology class, art (drawing, painting, and ceramics), Spanish, music, and physical education. When students graduate they attend high schools, including Elder High School, Seton High School (Cincinnati, Ohio), and St. Ursula Academy (Cincinnati, Ohio).

List of some clubs, organizations, and other school events
Environmental Club
Ambassador Board
Chess Club
Book Club
Math Club
STEM Club
Homeroom representatives
Field Day
First and Sixth Grade Buddies
OLV Walk Day
Blue and Gold Day
Spelling Bee
Geography Bee

Athletics 

Our Lady of Victory's sports include football, soccer, baseball, softball, basketball, volleyball, and golf. Victory has five baseball fields, a football field, and a soccer field. It also has two basketball/volleyball gyms. One of the gyms is part of a multi-purpose building called the Convocation Center. The other is a sport-specific gym known as the "Tin Can". Team colors are navy blue, light blue, and gold.

Festival
Victory's main fundraiser is the parish festival usually in mid-May. The festival includes rides, raffles, poker, a Sunday chicken dinner, booths, games of chance, performing bands, and food and drinks.

Holy Smokes
In August 2016, OLV hosted the first annual Holy Smokes Barbecue Competition. The event is sanctioned by the Kansas City Barbecue Society.

Notable alumni
Bill Hemmer, anchor on Fox News Channel
Jim Herman, professional golfer on the PGA Tour
Kyle Rudolph, professional football player (went to Victory for grades 1-3)

Name

Our Lady of Victory is named in honor of Mary. The story behind Our Lady of Victory is Pope Pius V told all of Europe to pray the Rosary for their army because they were heavily outnumbered by the Ottomans. Because they prayed for Mary's intercession, she helped them to win the battle over and stun the Ottomans. Since the battle was won, with help of Mary, she is called Our Lady of Victory.

Recent principals
Sally Hicks (2000-2006)
Jim Leisring (2007)
Kathy Kane (2008-2015)
Amy Borgman (2015–present)

References

External links
Our Lady of Victory

Education in Cincinnati
Catholic schools in Ohio
 Cincinnati